Albert M. Crampton (January 7, 1900 – March 13, 1953) was an American jurist.

Born in Moline, Illinois, Crampton graduated from Moline High School. Crampton received his law degree from Cornell Law School in 1922 and was admitted to the Illinois bar in 1923. He also studied law at Harvard Law School and University of Wisconsin Law School. Crampton practiced law in Moline and served as Moline City Court judge. From 1944 to 1947, Crampton served on the Illinois Board of Education and was a Republican. Crampton served on the Illinois Supreme Court from 1948 until his death in 1953. Crampton served as chief justice of the court. Crampton died in a hospital in Springfield, Illinois after suffering a heart attack while presiding over the supreme court.

Notes

1900 births
1953 deaths
People from Moline, Illinois
Cornell Law School alumni
Harvard Law School alumni
University of Wisconsin Law School alumni
Illinois Republicans
School board members in Illinois
Illinois state court judges
Chief Justices of the Illinois Supreme Court
20th-century American judges
Justices of the Illinois Supreme Court